Jack Shore (born 6 February 1995) is a Welsh professional mixed martial artist who currently competes in the Featherweight division of the Ultimate Fighting Championship (UFC). A professional competitor since 2016, he is the former Bantamweight champion in the Cage Warriors promotion. As of January 15, 2023, he is #15 in the UFC bantamweight rankings.

Background
Shore started kickboxing at 6 years old, at the behest of his father. After doing that for 4 years, his father opened an MMA gym in 2007 and has trained Jack since.

Mixed martial arts career

Early career 
Shore had an undefeated amateur tenure (12-0) concluded with a gold medal and four impressive triumphs in the men's lightweight division of the inaugural 2015 IMMAF European Open.

Cage Warriors
Shore made his debut as a featherweight against Tyler Thomas at Pain Pit Fight Night 15: Renegade on 5 March 2016, and won by a first-round submission. Three months later, he was scheduled to make his Cage Warriors debut against David Tonatiuh Crol at CWFC 76 on 4 June 2016. Shore made use of his superior grappling to take Crol down and submit him with a first-round rear-naked choke. Shore was next scheduled to face Eddie Pobivanez at CWFC 79 on 15 October 2016. Shore won the fight by a second-round technical knockout.

For his third fight with the promotion, Shore moved away from the Cage Warriors flagship events. He was scheduled to fight the undefeated Alexandros Gerolimatos at Cage Warriors FC: Academy Wales on 4 March 2017. Shore needed a little over two minutes to submit Gerolimatos with a rear-naked choke.

Shore made his fourth appearance with Cage Warriors at CWFC 83 on 6 May 2017, against Konmon Deh. Shore won the fight by a first-round armbar submission. Shore then faced Mattia Galbiati at CWFC 87 on 14 October 2017. He won the fight by a third-round knockout. Shore was scheduled to face Ayton De Paepe at CWFC 89 on 25 November 2017. It was Shore's last appearance as a featherweight with Cage Warriors. Shore won the fight by a first-round submission.

Shore moved down in weight to bantamweight for his seventh appearance with Cage Warriors. He was scheduled to fight Vaughan Lee at CWFC 92: Super Saturday on 24 March 2018. Shore won the fight by unanimous decision. Shore extended his winning streak to nine fights with a first-round technical knockout of Weslley Maia at CWFC 97 on 29 September 2018.

Cage Warriors Bantamweight champion
His nine-fight winning streak earned Shore the chance to challenge the reigning bantamweight champion Mike Ekundayo at CWFC 100 on 8 December 2018. Shore dominated his fellow undefeated prospect through takedowns and ground-and-pound, en route to a third-round technical knockout victory.

Shore was scheduled to make his first title defense against Scott Malone at CWFC 104 on 27 April 2019. Shore won the fight by a third-round rear-naked choke submission.

On 29 May 2019, it was announced that Shore had signed with the UFC.

Ultimate Fighting Championship
Shore made his promotional debut against Nohelin Hernandez at UFC Fight Night: Hermansson vs. Cannonier on 28 September 2019. He won the fight via third-round submission. The win earned him a Performance of the Night bonus.

He was then expected to make his sophomore appearance in the organization against Geraldo de Freitas at UFC Fight Night: Woodley vs. Edwards on 21 March 2020. However, the whole event was cancelled due to the COVID-19 pandemic.

He was scheduled to face Anderson dos Santos at UFC on ESPN: Kattar vs. Ige on 16 July 2020. However, dos Santos tested positive for COVID-19 before departing Brazil and was replaced by Aaron Phillips. He won the fight in the second round via rear-naked choke.

Next he was scheduled to face Khalid Taha on 7 November 2020 at UFC on ESPN: Santos vs. Teixeira. However, Shore was removed from the bout in late-October due to undisclosed reason and replaced by Raoni Barcelos.

Shore faced Hunter Azure at UFC on ABC: Vettori vs. Holland on 10 April 2021. He won the bout via split decision. 16 out of 16 media members scored the fight for Shore.

Shore was scheduled to face Said Nurmagomedov on 4 September 2021 at UFC Fight Night 191 However, Nurmagomedov was pulled from the event due to visa issues, and he was replaced by Zviad Lazishvili. In turn, Lazishvili pulled out from the bout due to injury and was replaced by Liudvik Sholinian. Shore won the fight via unanimous decision.

Shore was scheduled to face Umar Nurmagomedov on 19 March 2022, at UFC Fight Night 204. However, Nurmagomedov was removed from the bout for unknown reason and he was replaced by Timur Valiev.  Shore won the fight via unanimous decision.

Shore faced Ricky Simón on 16 July 2022 at UFC on ABC 3. He lost the bout via arm-triangle choke in the second round.

Shore was scheduled to face Kyler Phillips on November 19, 2022 at UFC Fight Night 215. However, Shore suffered "a serious knee injury" and is not expect to return to competition before the end of 2022.

Shore faced Makwan Amirkhani on March 18, 2023, at UFC 286. He won the fight via a rear-naked choke submission in the second round.

Championships and accomplishments

Mixed martial arts
Ultimate Fighting Championship
Performance of the Night (one time) 
Cage Warriors
CWFC Bantamweight Championship (one time; former)
 One successful title defense

Mixed martial arts record

|-
|Win
|align=center|17–1
|Makwan Amirkhani
|Submission (rear-naked choke)
|UFC 286
|
|align=center|2
|align=center|4:27
|London, England
|
|-
|Loss
|align=center|16–1
|Ricky Simón
|Submission (arm-triangle choke)
|UFC on ABC: Ortega vs. Rodríguez
|
|align=center|2
|align=center|3:28
|Elmont, New York, United States
|
|-
|Win
|align=center|16–0
|Timur Valiev
|Decision (unanimous)
|UFC Fight Night: Volkov vs. Aspinall
|
|align=center|3
|align=center|5:00
|London, England
|
|-
|Win
|align=center|15–0
|Liudvik Sholinian
|Decision (unanimous)
|UFC Fight Night: Brunson vs. Till 
|
|align=center|3
|align=center|5:00
|Las Vegas, Nevada, United States
|
|-
|Win
|align=center|14–0
|Hunter Azure
|Decision (split)
|UFC on ABC: Vettori vs. Holland
|
|align=center|3
|align=center|5:00
|Las Vegas, Nevada, United States
|
|-  
|Win
|align=center|13–0
|Aaron Phillips
|Submission (rear-naked choke)
|UFC on ESPN: Kattar vs. Ige 
|
|align=center|2
|align=center|2:29
|Abu Dhabi, United Arab Emirates
|
|-  
|Win
|align=center|12–0
|Nohelin Hernandez
|Submission (rear-naked choke)
|UFC Fight Night: Hermansson vs. Cannonier 
|
|align=center|3
|align=center|2:51
|Copenhagen, Denmark
|
|-  
|Win
|align=center|11–0
|Scott Malone
|Submission (rear-naked choke)
|Cage Warriors FC 104
|
|align=center|3
|align=center|2:28
|Cardiff, Wales
|
|-  
|Win
|align=center|10–0
|Mike Ekundayo
|TKO (punches)
|Cage Warriors FC 100
|
|align=center|3
|align=center|4:07
|Cardiff, Wales
|
|-
|Win
|align=center|9–0
|Weslley Maia
|TKO (elbows and punches)
|Cage Warriors FC 97
|
|align=center|1
|align=center|2:51
|Cardiff, Wales
|
|-
|Win
|align=center| 8–0
|Vaughan Lee
|Decision (unanimous)
|Cage Warriors FC 92: Super Saturday
|
|align=center|3
|align=center|5:00
|London, England
|
|-
|Win
|align=center| 7–0
|Ayton De Paepe
|Submission (rear-naked choke)
|Cage Warriors FC 89
|
|align=center|1
|align=center|3:04
|Antwerp, Belgium
|
|-
|Win
|align=center|6–0
|Mattia Galbiati
|KO (knee)
|Cage Warriors FC 87
|
|align=center|3
|align=center|4:14
|Newport, Wales
|
|-
|Win
|align=center|5–0
|Konmon Deh
|Submission (armbar)
|Cage Warriors FC 83
|
|align=center|1
|align=center|4:46
|Newport, Wales
|
|-
|Win
|align=center|4–0
|Alexandros Gerolimatos
|Submission (rear-naked choke)
|Cage Warriors FC: Academy Wales
|
|align=center|1
|align=center|2:03
|Newport, Wales
|
|-
|Win
|align=center|3–0
|Eddie Pobivanez
|TKO (punches)
|Cage Warriors FC 79
|
|align=center|2
|align=center|2:11
|Newport, Wales
|
|-
|Win
|align=center|2–0
|David Tonatiuh Crol
|Submission (rear-naked choke)
|Cage Warriors FC 76
|
|align=center|1
|align=center|3:36
|Newport, Wales
|
|-
|Win
|align=center|1–0
|Tyler Thomas
|Submission (rear-naked choke)
|Pain Pit Fight Night 15: Renegade
|
|align=center|1
|align=center|1:48
|Ebbw Vale, Wales
|
|-

See also 
 List of current UFC fighters
 List of male mixed martial artists

References

External links 
  
 

1995 births
Living people
Welsh male mixed martial artists
Bantamweight mixed martial artists
Mixed martial artists utilizing kickboxing
Mixed martial artists utilizing Brazilian jiu-jitsu
Ultimate Fighting Championship male fighters
Sportspeople from Abertillery
Welsh practitioners of Brazilian jiu-jitsu
People awarded a black belt in Brazilian jiu-jitsu